Alexandr Kolyadin (born 20 February 1973) is a Kazakhstani male cross-country skier. He has competed at the Winter Paralympics in 2014 and 2018. Alexandr Kolyadin claimed his first Paralympic medal at the age of 45 after winning the gold medal in the men's 1.5km sprint classic standing cross-country skiing event during the 2018 Winter Paralympics.

References

External links 
 

1973 births
Living people
Kazakhstani male cross-country skiers
Cross-country skiers at the 2014 Winter Paralympics
Cross-country skiers at the 2018 Winter Paralympics
Paralympic cross-country skiers of Kazakhstan
Paralympic gold medalists for Kazakhstan
Medalists at the 2018 Winter Paralympics
Paralympic medalists in cross-country skiing